The Diocese of Tuam, Limerick and Killaloe (full title The United Dioceses of Tuam, Killala, Achonry, Limerick, Ardfert, Aghadoe, Killaloe, Kilfenora, Clonfert, Kilmacduagh and Emly) is a diocese of the Church of Ireland that is located in the west of Ireland. The diocese was formed by a merger of the former Diocese of Tuam, Killala and Achonry and the former Diocese of Limerick and Killaloe in 2022, after the retirement of the separate dioceses' bishops and the appointment of Michael Burrows as bishop of the united diocese. It is in the ecclesiastical province of Dublin. It is one of the eleven Church of Ireland dioceses that cover the whole of Ireland. The largest diocese by area in the Church of Ireland, it covers all of counties Clare, Galway, Kerry, Limerick and Mayo, plus parts of counties Cork, Sligo, Roscommon, Offaly, Laois and Tipperary.

Overview and history
When the Church of England and the Roman Catholic Church broke communion, it was established by the state as the established church. Later, by decree of the Irish Parliament, the Church of Ireland became the independent State Church of the Kingdom of Ireland. It assumed possession of most Church property (and so retained a great repository of religious architecture and other items, though some were later destroyed). The substantial majority of the population remained faithful to Roman Catholicism, despite the political and economic advantages of membership in the state church. The English-speaking minority mostly adhered to the Church of Ireland or to Presbyterianism. 

On 13 April 1834, the diocese of Killala and Achonry was united to the Archdiocese of Tuam. On the death of Archbishop Trench of Tuam in 1839, the Province of Tuam was united to the Province of Armagh and the see ceased to be an archbishopric and became a bishopric with Thomas Plunket becoming the first bishop of Tuam, Killala and Achonry. Meanwhile, in 1833, the two provinces of Dublin and Cashel were merged. Over the centuries, a number of dioceses were merged (see below), in view of declining membership. It is for this reason that the united diocese has five cathedrals.

In 2019, the Church of Ireland General Synod agreed to amalgamate the two dioceses upon the retirement of their incumbent bishops. These retirements took place in 2021, and in 2022, Burrows was elected as the first bishop of Tuam, Limerick and Killaloe. He finished his service in the Diocese of Cashel, Ferns and Ossory in April 2022 and was installed in the united diocese that same month. Despite being the largest single diocese in area, the two prior dioceses each saw the lowest average Sunday attendance of any Church of Ireland dioceses with just 612 in attendance in Tuam, Killala and Achonry and 1,205 in attendance in Limerick and Killaloe, according to the most recently available Church of Ireland census data. The united diocese's attendance of 1,817 make it the second-least-attended diocese in the Church of Ireland after Meath and Kildare.

Predecessor dioceses
The present united diocese dates from 2022, the result of a number of mergers of sees beginning in the seventeenth century:

Cathedrals

 St. Mary's Cathedral, Tuam
St. Patrick's Cathedral, Killala.
 St Mary's Cathedral, Limerick, 
 St Flannan's Cathedral, Killaloe, 
 St Brendan's Cathedral, Clonfert.
Five others are in ruins or no longer exist:
St Brendan's Cathedral, Ardfert was destroyed by fire in 1641
St Alibeus' Cathedral, Emly was demolished in 1877.
Kilmacduagh cathedral, which is partly in ruins
Aghadoe Cathedral, which is partly in ruins
Kilfenora Cathedral, which is partly in ruins, dates from the 12th century.
St. Crumnathy's Cathedral, Achonry was deconsecrated in 1998 and is now used for ecumenical events.

Parish groups
As of 2022, the united diocese is divided into a number of parishes, each led by a priest serving multiple churches.

 Achonry Parish: St George's Church, Tubbercurry Rathbarron.
 Adare Parish: St Nicholas', Adare Croom St Peter & St Paul's, Kilmallock St Beacon's, Kilpeacon.
 Aughaval (Westport) Parish: Christ Church, Castlebar St. Thomas' Church, Dugort Turlough Church Holy Trinity Church, Westport.
 Aughrim Parish: St Catherine's, Ahascragh Ardrahan Holy Trinity, Aughrim St John the Evangelist, Creagh Woodlawn, Kilconell.
 Birr Parish: St Brendan's, Birr Dorrha Lockeen St Ruadhan's, Lorrha.
 Clonfert Parish: St Brendan's Cathedral, Clonfert St John the Baptist, Donanaughta Christ Church, Lickmolassy St Paul's, Rynagh.
 Cloughjordan Parish: Ballingarry Borrisnafarney Borrisokane St Kieran's, Cloughjordan.
 Drumcliffe (Ennis) Parish: St Columba, Drumcliffe Kilfarboy St Fachan's, Kilfenora St James', Kilfieragh Kilnasoolagh.
 Galway Parish: St. Nicholas' Collegiate Church, Galway Kilcummin Church, Oughterard.
 Kenmare Parish: St Patrick's, Kenmare Church of the Transfiguration, Sneem St. Michael and All Angels, Waterville St. John the Baptist, Valentia
 Kilcolman (Killorglin) Parish: St Michael's, Killorglin St Carthage's, Kiltallagh.
 Killala Parish: St. John's Church, Ballycastle St. Mary's Church, Crossmolina St. Patrick's Cathedral, Killala
 Killaloe Parish: Iniscaltra St Flannan's Cathedral, Killaloe St Senan's, Kiltinanlea All Saints', Stradbally St. Cronan's Church, Tuamgraney.
 Killarney Parish: St Mary, Killarney Holy Trinity, Muckross.
 Kilmoremoy Parish: St. Michael's, Ballina Killanley Church, Castleconnor St. Anne's Easkey Kilglass.
 Limerick City Parish: St Mary's Cathedral, Limerick Sts John and Ailbe, Abington St Michael's, Limerick.
 Nenagh Parish: Killodiernan St Mary's, Nenagh Templederry.
 Omey (Clifden) Parish: Christ Church, Clifden Holy Trinity Church, Errislannan St. Thomas' Church, Ballynakill St. Mary's Church, Roundstone.
 Rathkeale and Kilnaughtin Parish: St Mary's, Askeaton Castletown, Kilcornan St Brendan's, Kilnaughtin Holy Trinity, Rathkeale.
 Roscrea Parish: St Bruchin's, Bourne Christ Church, Corbally St Molua, Kyle St Cronan's, Roscrea.
 Shinrone Parish: Aghancon  Dunkerrin St Finnian's, Kinnitty St Mary's, Shinrone.
 Skreen Parish: Christ Church, Dromard St. Mary's Church, Kilmacshalgan  Skreen.
 Tralee Parish: Ballymacelligott Ballyseedy St James's, Dingle Kilgobbin Camp St. Brendan's, Killiney, Castlegregory St John's, Tralee.
 Tuam Parishes: St. John the Baptist, Aasleagh St. Mary's, Cong St. Mary's Cathedral, Tuam.
 University: University of Limerick Chaplaincy

Lists of bishops

Bishops of Tuam, Killala and Achonry 
 The Hon. Thomas Plunket (1839–1866)
 The Hon. Charles Brodrick Bernard (1867–1890)
 James O'Sullivan (1890–1913)
 The Hon. Benjamin John Plunket (1913–1919)
 Arthur Edwin Ross (1920–1923)
 John Orr (192–1927)
 John Mason Harden (1928–1931)
 William Hardy Holmes (1932–1938)
 John Winthrop Crozier (1939–1957)
 Arthur Hamilton Butler (1958–1969)
 John Coote Duggan (1970–1985)
 John Robert Winder Neill (1986–1997)
 Richard Crosbie Aitken Henderson (1998–2011)
 Patrick William Rooke (2011–2021)

Bishops of Limerick and Killaloe 
 Edwin Owen (1976–1981)
 Walton Newcombe Francis Empey (1981–1985)
 Edward Flewett Darling (1985–2000)
 Michael Hugh Gunton Mayes (2000–2008)
 Trevor Williams (2008–2014)
 Kenneth Kearon (2015–2021)

Bishops of Tuam, Limerick and Killaloe 
 Michael Burrows (2022–present)

See also

 List of Anglican dioceses in the United Kingdom and Ireland
 Archdiocese of Tuam (Church of Ireland)
 Dean of Tuam
 Archdeacon of Tuam
 Dean of Limerick and Ardfert
 Dean of Killaloe and Clonfert
 Roman Catholic Archdiocese of Tuam
 Roman Catholic Diocese of Killala
 Roman Catholic Diocese of Achonry
 Roman Catholic Diocese of Limerick
 Roman Catholic Diocese of Kerry (formerly Ardfert and Aghadoe)
 Roman Catholic Diocese of Killaloe
 Roman Catholic Diocese of Galway, Kilmacduagh and Kilfenora
 Roman Catholic Diocese of Clonfert
 Roman Catholic Archdiocese of Cashel and Emly

References

External links
 Church of Ireland diocesan webpage

Religion in County Limerick
Religion in County Clare
Religion in County Kerry
Tuam, Limerick and Killaloe
Church of Ireland in the Republic of Ireland
Religion in County Galway
Religion in County Mayo
Religion in County Sligo
Archdeacons of Killala and Achonry
Archdeacons of Tuam